Ropley Dean is a village in the East Hampshire district of Hampshire, England. It is 7.3 miles (11.7 km) southwest of Alton.

The village has its own restored railway station on the Watercress Line. Trains from here connect with the nearest national rail station 7.3 miles (11.7 km) to the northeast, at Alton.

Villages in Hampshire